Sargis Pitsak was an early 14th-century Armenian artist. Nearly 50 illustrated manuscripts are attributed to him. His father was called Grigor.

Pitsak lived in Cilicia, during a difficult period when epidemics often followed wars. He copied and illustrated manuscripts on the request of King Levon IV, queen Mariun and others.

Pitsak seems to have been familiar with the work of Toros Roslin and he completed the illustration of a famous Gospel (Matenadaran, Cod. 7651), in which some miniatures reflect Roslin's influence.

Gallery

References

External links 
 Think quest

Armenian painters
14th-century painters
Manuscript illuminators
Year of death unknown
Year of birth unknown
Medieval Armenian painters